The 1962 Wimbledon Championships took place on the outdoor grass courts at the All England Lawn Tennis and Croquet Club in Wimbledon, London, United Kingdom. The tournament was held from Monday 25 June until Saturday 7 July 1962. It was the 76th staging of the Wimbledon Championships, and the third Grand Slam tennis event of 1962. Rod Laver and Karen Susman won the singles titles.

Champions

Seniors

Men's singles

 Rod Laver defeated  Martin Mulligan, 6–2, 6–2, 6–1

Women's singles

 Karen Susman defeated  Věra Suková, 6–4, 6–4

Men's doubles

 Bob Hewitt /  Fred Stolle defeated  Boro Jovanović /  Nikola Pilić, 6–2, 5–7, 6–2, 6–4

Women's doubles

 Billie Jean Moffitt /  Karen Susman defeated  Sandra Price /  Renée Schuurman, 5–7, 6–3, 7–5

Mixed doubles

 Neale Fraser /  Margaret duPont defeated  Dennis Ralston /  Ann Haydon, 2–6, 6–3, 13–11

Juniors

Boys' singles

 Stanley Matthews defeated  Alex Metreveli, 10–8, 3–6, 6–4

Girls' singles

 Galina Baksheeva defeated  Elizabeth Terry, 6–4, 6–2

References

External links
 Official Wimbledon Championships website

 
Wimbledon Championships
Wimbledon Championships
Wimbledon Championships
Wimbledon Championships